Sodium iodide (chemical formula NaI) is an ionic compound formed from the chemical reaction of sodium metal and iodine. Under standard conditions, it is a white, water-soluble solid comprising a 1:1 mix of sodium cations (Na+) and iodide anions (I−) in a crystal lattice. It is used mainly as a nutritional supplement and in organic chemistry. It is produced industrially as the salt formed when acidic iodides react with sodium hydroxide. It is a chaotropic salt.

Uses

Food supplement
Sodium iodide, as well as potassium iodide, is commonly used to treat and prevent iodine deficiency.  Iodized table salt contains 10 ppm iodide.

Organic synthesis

Sodium iodide is used for conversion of alkyl chlorides into alkyl iodides.  This method, the Finkelstein reaction, relies on the insolubility of sodium chloride in acetone to drive the reaction:

R–Cl + NaI → R–I + NaCl

Nuclear medicine
Some radioactive iodide salts of sodium, including Na125I and Na131I, have radiopharmaceuticalf thyroid cancer and hyperthyroidism or as radioactive tracer in imaging (see Isotopes of iodine > Radioiodines I-123, I-124, I-125, and I-131 in medicine and biology).

Thallium-doped NaI(Tl) scintillators
Sodium iodide activated with thallium, NaI(Tl), when subjected to ionizing radiation, emits photons (i.e., scintillate) and is used in scintillation detectors, traditionally in nuclear medicine, geophysics, nuclear physics, and environmental measurements. NaI(Tl) is the most widely used scintillation material. The crystals are usually coupled with a photomultiplier tube, in a hermetically sealed assembly, as sodium iodide is hygroscopic. Fine-tuning of some parameters (i.e., radiation hardness, afterglow, transparency) can be achieved by varying the conditions of the crystal growth. Crystals with a higher level of doping are used in X-ray detectors with high spectrometric quality. Sodium iodide can be used both as single crystals and as polycrystals for this purpose. The wavelength of maximum emission is 415 nm.

Radiocontrast
António Egas Moniz searched for a radiocontrast agent for cerebral angiography. After experiments on rabbits and dogs he settled upon sodium iodide as the best medium.

Solubility data
Sodium iodide exhibits high solubility in some organic solvents, unlike sodium chloride or even bromide:

Stability
Iodides (including sodium iodide) are detectably oxidized by atmospheric oxygen (O2) to molecular iodine (I2). I2 and I− complex to form the triiodide complex, which has a yellow color, unlike the white color of sodium iodide. Water accelerates the oxidation process, and iodide can also produce I2 by photooxidation, therefore for maximum stability sodium iodide should be stored under dark, low temperature, low humidity  conditions.

See also
 Gamma spectroscopy
 Scintillation counter
 Teratology

References

Cited sources

External links

 
 
 
 

Alkali metal iodides
Inorganic compounds
Iodides

Metal halides
Phosphors and scintillators
Sodium compounds
Chaotropic agents
Rock salt crystal structure